Chryseobacterium yonginense  is a Gram-negative and non-motile bacteria from the genus of Chryseobacterium which has been isolated from a mesotrophic artificial lake in Korea.

References

Further reading 
 

yonginense
Bacteria described in 2011